Linn Kazmaier (born 5 November 2006) is a German visually impaired cross-country skier and biathlete who competed at the 2022 Winter Paralympics.

Career
Kazmaier represented Germany at the 2022 Winter Paralympics and won five medals. She won two silver medals in the 6 kilometres and 12.5 kilometres biathlon events, and a gold medal in the 10 kilometre free, a silver medal in the 15 kilometre classical and a bronze medal in the 1.5 kilometres sprint cross-country skiing events. At 15 years old, she was the youngest para biathlete at the Paralympics.

References 

Living people
2006 births
Biathletes at the 2022 Winter Paralympics
Cross-country skiers at the 2022 Winter Paralympics
Medalists at the 2022 Winter Paralympics
Paralympic gold medalists for Germany
Paralympic silver medalists for Germany
Paralympic bronze medalists for Germany
Paralympic medalists in biathlon
Paralympic medalists in cross-country skiing
Paralympic biathletes of Germany
Paralympic cross-country skiers of Germany
21st-century German women